The Big Sur Land Trust is a private 501(c)(3) non-profit located in Monterey, California, that has played an instrumental role in preserving land in California's Big Sur and Central Coast regions. The trust was the first to conceive of and use the "conservation buyer" method in 1989 by partnering with government and developers to offer tax benefits as an inducement to sell land at below-market rates. , it has protected around  through acquisition and resale to government agencies.

The trust was founded in 1978 by a small group of local Big Sur residents who were members of the Big Sur Citizens' Advisory Committee. Four of the residents visited the San Francisco offices of The Trust for Public Land in 1977 where they learned about land-trust finance and management.  They decided to form an organization that could promote environmental protection in keeping with the Coast Master Plan and the California Coastal Commission. In February 1978 the community members incorporated The Big Sur Land Trust as a nonprofit California corporation.  Their original aim was to protect Big Sur's natural beauty "from over development without recourse to government control while recognizing a property owners' right to sell to whomever they wish". The trust has partnered with many public and private agencies and organizations to protect land.

Access to lands owned by the trust are in many instances limited to the approximately 1,200 individuals who pay $50 a year to join the trust. The board is composed of wealthy local and regional powerbrokers. The trust has been described by some as "elitist". It has been criticized for some of its deals that have benefited wealthy individuals and for an instance when a board member who was also a public official did not disclose their apparent conflict of interest to affected parties. Some object to the trust buying private land and selling it to public agencies.

History 

In 1977, a small group of local Big Sur residents were appointed by Monterey County to the Big Sur Citizens' Advisory Committee.  They were assisting the county in developing a Coast Master Plan for Big Sur. Retired oil company executive Earl Moser, who helped lead an effort to prevent building a refinery at Moss Landing near Monterey, chaired the effort.

The diverse group shared a common mistrust held by Big Sur residents of added government. They knew local groups were already upset by what they viewed as the California state park's lack of responsiveness to local concerns. The Coast Master Plan and the laws enforced by the California Coastal Commission published new rules for clean air and water, protecting land and sea, endangered species, disposing of hazardous waste  and procedures for evaluating new development along the coast with environmental impact reports. A group of Big Sur residents decided to form their own organization that could promote environmental protection reflecting the desires of the people who lived there.

The Big Sur Land Trust is well-regarded and ranked alongside notable trusts like Washington's San Juan Preservation Trust, Wyoming's Jackson Hole Land Trust, New York's Adirondacks Land Trust, and Maine Coast Heritage Trust.

Founders 

In 1978, seven families formed the Big Sur Land Trust. They envisioned preserving the iconic Big Sur landscape for the benefit of future generations. The founding members were Zad Leavy, an experienced attorney and his wife Laela, Sherna and Kipp Stewart, Roger and Beverly Newell, Nancy Hopkins, Lloyd and Pat Addleman, Martin and Suzanne Forster and Peter Harding. Hopkins, daughter-in-law of Hewlett Packard founder David Packard, became the trust's first president. Attorney Zad Leavy became its first executive director and served for 25 years.

Board of Trustees 

The Big Sur Land Trust is governed by a board of trustees. , the board had 16 board members, including 12 trustees and four administrators: board chair, co-chair, treasurer and secretary. Board members represent local and regional powerbrokers. The board is supported by a 10-member advisory council. Donors include a Who's Who of local philanthropists. Individuals can join the trust for a $50 annual fee, which also grants them access by payment of an entrance fee to the trust's privately owned lands. The trust is operated by a professional staff and supported by hundreds of members and volunteers.

Changes mission emphasis 

When it was founded in 1978, the trust's mission was to conserve important waters and lands along California's Central Coast and focus on purchasing property for conservation in perpetuity. It has emphasized conserving unique landscapes on the California central coast including stream spawning beds for threatened steelhead trout, coastal redwoods, grasslands and oak woodlands. Along with its land acquisition and conservation easements activities, the trust engages in environmental education.

In 2014, as land values increased and public agency budgets shrank, the trust remodeled how it presents itself to the public, shifting away from emphasizing its considerable land holdings to focus on the well-being of people and land stewardship on the Central Coast. It's striving to allow more people to gain access to the land it has protected. The trust now manages several properties within Monterey County. The most southern property is the Circle M Ranch near Lucia, California and the most northern properties are the Vierra Ranch and Rancho Colinas in the Gabilan Mountain foothills.

First land deal

In February 1978, as the trust was being formed, it received an undivided half-interest in  just north of the Esalen Institute from its co-founder Michael Murphy. The national Trust for Public Land held the half-interest in the Esalen land until the Big Sur trust's federal tax-exempt status was approved by the Internal Revenue Service. Founding member Peter Harding donated the $1,250 filing fee. The mother of one of Murphy's neighbors gave the trust leaders about $2,000 to help start the land fund. The trust still owns the land.

Big Sur Coastal Land Use Plan 

The first master plan for the Big Sur coast was written in 1962 by architect and part- time local resident Nathaniel Owings. The members of the Big Sur Citizens' Advisory Committee, who later founded the trust, met with Big Sur residents and county administrators to draft a new land use plan. The new Big Sur Local Coastal Program was approved after four years of work and several months of public hearings and discussion, including input from the residents of Big Sur. It is one of the most restrictive in the state because of efforts to conserve scenic views and the unparalleled beauty of the area. The Coastal Commission approved the plan in April 1986. It remains the primary document used to determine what kind of development is allowed. The plan states: "The overall direction for the future of the Big Sur Coast is based around the theme of preserving the outstanding natural environment.... The County's basic policy is to prohibit all future public or private development visible from Highway 1".

Financing 

The trust is supported through memberships fees, private donations, and public conservation funding. Some of its funding comes from California Proposition 70. It generated $776 million in funding for parks, wildlife, and coast conservation. The trust contributed $300,000 to help pass the proposition, one of the largest donations to the effort. Many of the individuals and groups active in the Big Sur land use planning project lent their support to the campaign in support of Proposition 70. County Supervisor Karin Strasser Kauffman, a strong supporter of conservation efforts, supported the effort and the trust. The trust distributed petitions across the state. The initiative passed by a wide margin of 65 percent in June 1988. Proposition 70 funds are distributed to and allocated by county governments.

It also receives specialized grants, including a grant in 2016 for the Carmel River Floodplain Restoration and Environmental Enhancement project and the Carr Lake Project.

As of the reporting period ending in June 2016, the trust had revenue of $6,088,077, income totaling $6,533,045, and assets of $35,452,353. The assets included land worth $19,973,147 and an endowment totaling $6,934,068. It paid its officers a total of $278,759 in compensation and spent $112,000 for lobbying.

Partnerships 

As property values continue to rise in California's Central Coast, the trust has partnered with Monterey Peninsula Regional Park District, The Nature Conservancy, and the California Natural Resources Agency in land acquisition and conservation projects.

Pioneer conservation buyer method 

In 1989, Zad Leavy, a founder of the trust and long-time attorney, conceived of the idea of inducing landowners to sell property through a process later called the "conservation buyer method". It allows a landowner who permanently gives up their developmental rights to the non-profit trust to deduct from their income taxes the difference between the fair market value before the restrictions are in place with the value afterward. The sellers receive a substantial one-time tax reduction, and the new buyers continually benefit permanently from the lowered property taxes.

Controversial deals 

Some opponents have criticized the actions of conservation groups like the trust as having "turned the buyout of Big Sur into a business, making millions of dollars buying private land and selling it to government agencies."

Gamboa Ranch 

The owners of the land, 19 New York lawyers, had foreclosed on the $1 million mortgage in 1971 and in early 1979 were seeking to sell the land. Potential buyers from Oklahoma consulted with California Coastal Commissioner Zad Leavy about allowed usage for the land. After receiving his input, they were confident enough about their plan for a retreat-like development to skip a planned 60-day escrow and made a $1.6 million offer to buy the land from the New York attorneys, which they verbally accepted.

A few days later Commissioner Leavy, without informing the Oklahoma purchasers, switched roles. Acting in his capacity as the attorney for the Big Sur Land Trust, he interrupted the attorneys' meeting during which they were planning to conclude the sale. Leavy offered them $1.2 million in cash and $800,000 in tax credits, the difference between the land's market value and selling price. The tax credit almost completely offset their capital-gains tax payments on the sale.

The six Oklahoma buyers, who had meanwhile flown to California to tour the property for a second time, were "flabbergasted" to learn their agreement had been turned down for a deal that Coastal Commissioner Leavy had arranged acting as attorney for the trust. They were completely unaware that he was acting in any other capacity than as a public official.

At the same time the trust was negotiating with the attorneys, they also brought in the father-in-law of board member Nancy Hopkins, Hewlett-Packard co-founder David Packard. The entire deal was consummated in less than 48 hours. In a complicated legal strategy known as a double-escrow, the trust bought the land, and during the few minutes they owned the land, they applied a highly restrictive conservation easement on the property. The easement significantly reduced the property's value. Packard wanted a piece of open coastal land and was happy with the covenants and restrictions, but he was initially concerned that the proposed contract wasn't legal. He asked Executive Director Zad Leavy to confirm that it was permitted by law.

Once Packard was reassured, the trust almost instantly sold him . The trust paid the lawyers $1.125 million, and the lawyers also received a $900,000 charitable donation that offset their capital gains in exchange for the loss they took in selling the land to the trust. Referring to the Oklahoma investors, Leavy commented afterward that "We just barely sneaked under the radar, we just barely beat them".

The trust sold the other half of the land to the University of California who established the Landels-Hill Big Creek Reserve. Due to a revised exclusion to the real estate listing required by the trust, the realtor who had marketed the property and paid over $6,000 for a full-color brochure among other expenses was not reimbursed.

The Big Sur Gazette and the local Coast Property Owners Association charged that Leavy had engaged in a conflict of interest by not revealing both his roles as both a Coastal Commission member and the trust's legal adviser. It charged the trust with engaging in deceptive practices. The trust responded that it only works with willing sellers, who choose to place easements on their property which they retained.

Clint Eastwood land deals 

Clint Eastwood bought six parcels totalling  along Highway 1 near Malpaso Creek, south of the Carmel Highlands, during the 1960s. In 1995, Monterey County bought the land from him for $3.08 million, despite the fact that in July 1994 the county assessor showed the land's assessed value as only $308,682. The county put a permanent conservation easement on the Malpaso property.

Using the proceeds from the sale, Eastwood bought the  Odello Ranch at the mouth of the Carmel River during the same year. The ranch had been used for several decades as farm land, most recently to produce artichokes. When he bought the property, Eastwood paid to lower the levees along the southern side of the Carmel River. This helped to protect the Mission Ranch resort he owned, along with the neighboring Mission Fields residential neighborhood on the north side of the river, both of which were flooded in 1994.

In December 1995, Eastwood sought to exercise his right to appropriate the water rights linked to the Odello property from the State Water Resources Control Board. Eastwood and his representatives said during a public hearing on his request that the appropriation was needed to establish the fair market value of the Odello Ranch for tax purposes. He said he might donate the land along with the water rights to the Big Sur Land Trust.

In 1997, Eastwood and his former wife Maggie Johnson (acting as the Eastwood Trust) donated  of the Odello Ranch property east of Highway 1 to the trust along with the associated water rights. It took several years to work out the details, however.

In a complicated exchange, on June 28, 2016, Eastwood finally donated the remaining Odello East land. Eastwood had meanwhile purchased  known as the Cañada Woods development immediately east of the Odello Ranch. In a proposal that was scaled back from prior plans for the Cañada Woods location, he reduced the number of homes and planned to restore the Rancho Cañada Golf Course to open space. Eastwood got approval from the county to remove nine lots from his Odello property and 10 lots from his Cañada Woods development.

In exchange, Eastwood transferred the development rights for the 19 units to land adjacent to a  parcel known as Cañada Woods East. This parcel had been donated in 1983 by William Cusack to the Big Sur Land Trust and had been set aside as a permanent scenic easement. Eastwood bought the parcel from the trust for $150,000. Although the trust owned the land, the county held the conservation easement, and Leavy characterized the county's decision to lift that easement as part of the Eastwood purchase as "a political decision". Leavy, representing the trust, said that preserving the Odello Ranch property had greater priority over the land donated by Cusack. Critics complained about the precedent of selling land without public comment for development purposes that had been set aside as open space.

The Big Sur trust has previously raised a portion of an estimated $25 million to open a causeway under Highway 1 that will allow more unrestricted flow of the Carmel River into the floodplain west of the highway, reducing the likelihood of flooding.

In the same deal, Eastwood donated  to Monterey County, which will use some of the land for flood control. The California American Water company received  in the deal that enables them to place two wells that will pump water from the aquifer under Carmel River nearer to the mouth of the Carmel Valley. In an unusual move, the Eastwood Trust agreed to sell  of its 2016 water rights to help offset Cal-Am's existing unlawful diversions from the Carmel River aquifer, and half of that amount in 2017.

Although the State Water Resources Control Board had issued a cease and desist order barring Cal-Am from making water available for new connections. it approved the Odello East diversion. The  State Water Resources Control Board ruled:

, the Malpaso property formerly owned by Eastwood and currently owned by the Big Sur trust is off-limits to the public and there are no plans to allow public access. To manage the sale of the water, Eastwood formed the Malpaso Water Company, LLC, which was permitted to enter into subscription agreements with new water users. Eastwood's new water company may receive up to $200,000 per acre foot. Under the terms of Eastwood's and Johnson's donation of the Odello property to the Big Sur trust, they received a $6 million tax write-off.

Land ownership 

, the trust had acquired a number of parcels that they continue to own. The table below summarizes major trust acquisitions. The trust obtains the property rights and can choose to retain the land in perpetuity or coordinate with another organization to transfer the parcel into a larger conserved area.

Conservation easements 

In these instances, the property owners agree to give up the right to develop the land and to conserve resources in perpetuity.

The landowner receives a one-time tax break, the difference between the prior market value and the value after the ability to develop the land is removed. They also receive the benefit of an ongoing reduction in property taxes. The conservation agreement stipulates that the conserved lands are managed based on values and intentions stipulated to by both parties.

Land transfers 

Land transfers are instances where the trust purchases property and then sells or donates the land to a third party. When the property is transferred a conservation easement is added to the title requiring the buyer to maintain the land in its undeveloped state. These kinds of transfers usually incorporate the property into a larger park. The third parties have included private individuals, the Monterey Peninsula Regional Park District, the United States Forest Service, and California State Parks and Recreation.

The trust collaborates with state and regional agencies and other conservation partners to preserve larger purchases. The easements help expand wildlife habitat and native plant populations within watersheds.

Other projects 

The trust works on a number of projects in the Monterey County region. Projects focus on the expansion of preserved natural habitat for unique central coast species, and increasing the opportunities available for community members to connect with the environment.

Carmel River Parkway 

Starting in 2004, the Big Sur Land Trust began efforts to collaborate with other agencies and the local community to protect and restore the Carmel River. They developed a conservation plan to restore and enhance the Carmel River ecosystem. One of the major components is a recreational trail that will connect the lower Carmel Valley to upper reaches of the watershed. About 20 agencies and organizations and more than 200 residents contributed to the planning. Known as the Carmel River Parkway Vision Plan, it includes integrated plans for trails, park lands, restored natural areas, and public informational sites in the Carmel River watershed.

 The South Bank Trail

Monterey County secured a grant to design the trail, and the trust received private donations to acquire an easement from private landowners to build the trail. It was completed in October 2011.

 Carmel River floodplain restoration

The Carmel River Floodplain Restoration and Environmental Enhancement Project is a plan to restore the natural hydrology of the Carmel River near the Carmel Lagoon and minimize flood risk. When the project is completed, it's expected to:

 Improve habitat for steelhead.
 Increase connectivity between the river channel, floodplain, and lagoon.
 Restore native riparian and grassland habitat.
 Reduce flood risk for businesses and residences in Lower Carmel Valley.

Lobos-Corona Parklands Project 

In 2017, the trust signed a memorandum of understanding with California State Parks, Monterey Peninsula Regional Park District, and the Point Lobos Foundation committing to work together to open up the connected properties to the public. The Allen Ranch at the center of the properties is key to the plan, as it makes it possible to add parking that has otherwise been impossible to build due to right-of-way issues., Point Lobos has only 150 on-site parking spaces. Visitors must park on the shoulder of Highway 1 and often cross it to enter Point Lobos.

The Lobos-Corona Parklands Project is a collaboration between the Monterey Peninsula Regional Park District, the Big Sur Land Trust, California State Parks, and the Point Lobos Foundation. The trust was a leader in a number of components of the Lobos-Corona project including developing the Carmel River Parkway Project and the South Bank Trail. The organization has also contributed to land acquisition and development at Palo Corona Regional Park.

The Big Sur Land Trust purchased the former A.M. Allen Ranch from the Whisler and Wilson Family Trusts in 2003 for $4.25 million and sold the property to the Monterey Peninsula Regional Park District in 2013 for $4 million. The property spans the east side of Highway 1 from Carmel to Pt. Lobos and connects Palo Corona Regional Park to Point Lobos Ranch. In collaboration with the Monterey Regional Park District, the trust developed the  Hatton Canyon recreational trail that connects the top of Carmel Hill to the lower Camel River Trail System at Carmel Valley Road. The trust also helped establish a visitor access and land management plan to address land management issues, including:

 Habitat monitoring for special status animals on the Central Coast including the California red-legged frog and California tiger salamander.
 Maintenance of healthy grasslands and control of invasive plant species.
 Protection of biologically diverse habitats.

Carr Lake Multi-Use Park 

In 2016, the trust received a grant from the California Coastal Conservancy to acquire Carr Lake, a  undeveloped space in the center of Salinas, California. The low-lying land has been largely used as farmland. Runoff from the farming operations flows northeast through a reclamation ditch toward Tembladero Slough and into the old Salinas River, and eventually into the Monterey Bay National Marine Sanctuary. Sediments that have accumulated in the ditch increase flood risk to nearby homes. The trust is working with city of Salinas to re-purpose the land and create a multi-use community park. The trust acquired  on January 25, 2017, from Ikeda Farms Partnership for $3.95 million. The land is to remain in use for agriculture purposes for several years while the trust works with community organizations and develops a plan for the land. The purchase was funded by California State Coastal Conservancy, the California Natural Resources Agency River Parkways Program, David and Lucile Packard Foundation, Monterey Peninsula Foundation and the Barnet Segal Charitable Trust.

Notes

References

External links 

 
 
 
 
 

Land trusts in California
Nature conservation organizations based in the United States
1978 establishments in California
Monterey, California
Big Sur